The Women's 5000 metres at the 2011 All-Africa Games took place on 11 September at the Beijing National Stadium.

Medalists

Records 
Prior to this competition, the existing World, African record and World leading were as follows:

Results

Final

References

5000m women
2011 in women's athletics